Aswan is a city in the south of Egypt.

Aswan may also refer to:

 Aswan (horse)
 Aswan (international airport)
 Aswan Harmud
 Aswan SC

See also
 
 Aswang (disambiguation)